Homer Le Grand Lyon (March 1, 1879 – May 31, 1956) was a U.S. Representative from North Carolina.

Born in Elizabethtown, North Carolina, Lyon attended the public schools, the Davis Military School, Winston, North Carolina, and the law department of the University of North Carolina at Chapel Hill.
He was admitted to the bar in 1900 and commenced practice in Whiteville, North Carolina.
He served as delegate to every Democratic State convention from 1901 to 1921.
He served as delegate to the Democratic National Conventions in 1904 and 1940.
He served as solicitor of the eighth judicial district of North Carolina 1913-1920.

Lyon was elected as a Democrat to the Sixty-seventh and to the three succeeding Congresses (March 4, 1921 – March 3, 1929).
He was not a candidate for renomination in 1928.
He resumed the practice of law in Whiteville, North Carolina, until his retirement in 1950.
He died in Whiteville, North Carolina, May 31, 1956.
He was interred in Memorial Cemetery.

Sources

1879 births
1956 deaths
Democratic Party members of the United States House of Representatives from North Carolina
University of North Carolina School of Law alumni
People from Elizabethtown, North Carolina
People from Whiteville, North Carolina